Tappan Lake, also known as Tappan Reservoir, is a reservoir in Harrison County, Ohio, United States.

The lake has a  limit for boats. There are two public launch ramps - one near the roadside rest area on U.S. 250, and the other across from Tappan Marina. A third launch ramp is located inside Tappan Lake Park.

It is located between Cadiz and Dennison. U.S. Route 250 follows Tappan Lake for several miles on a series of causeways built during the construction of the lake in the 1930s.

Tappan Lake took its name from the former community of Tappan, which was inundated with the completion of the lake in 1938. The former town of Laceyville lies beneath the lake.

References

External links
 Ohio DNR fishing map of Tappan Lake
 Tappan Lake Fishing
 

Bodies of water of Harrison County, Ohio
Reservoirs in Ohio
Muskingum Watershed Conservancy District
United States Army Corps of Engineers, Huntington District
Tourist attractions in Harrison County, Ohio
U.S. Route 250